A cubby-hole, cubby-house or cubby is a small play house, or play area, for children.  This may be constructed by the children themselves and used as a place of play.  Autistic children can sometimes benefit from such places.
Children may have a small shed, play-house or tent which they use as a cubby-house. Children might build their own in various places in the house or garden, or have a pre-fabricated cubby. An Australian fictional treatment of the quest for the perfect cubby can be found in Ursula Dubosarsky's The Cubby House, illustrated by Mitch Vane.

Etymology
Possibly from the term "cub" in old English related to "stall, pen, cattle shed, coop, hutch". "Cubby-hole" is sometimes written as one word (cubbyhole).

Meanings in various countries
In South Africa, cubby-hole or cubby is the word for a glove compartment in a vehicle. This usage is also common in Barbados, Zambia, Botswana and Zimbabwe, as well as parts of Southern Minnesota; Madison, South Dakota; and Northwest Wyoming.

In the UK, Ireland and Canada, it may refer to the cupboard under the stairs. In Quebec, the French word cagibi, which is a contraction of cage à bijoux, and roughly translates as "jewel case", is synonymous with a triangular storage walk-in located directly under the inner stairs of a house.

In the United States, a cubby-hole most often refers to a small square or rectangle-shaped space where children may keep their personal belongings, such as in a preschool or kindergarten setting. These cubby-holes are often constructed out of the same materials as bookshelves and have a similar appearance save for the division of the cubbies themselves.

See also
 Wendy house

References

Childhood
Buildings and structures by type